Parazen may refer to:

Parazen, Iran, a village in Hormozgan Province, Iran
Parazen (fish), a genus of fishes in the family Parazenidae